Stalker, also known as Exposé, is a 2010 psychological horror film directed by Martin Kemp and starring Jane March, Anna Brecon and Jennifer Matter. It is a remake of the 1976 film Exposé, starring Linda Hayden, who makes a cameo appearance in this film.

Plot
Having published a bestseller, writer Paula Martin retreats to her family's gothic country house, Crow's Hall, to focus on writing a new book. Struggling with writer's block and nightmares of her abusive childhood, she takes on an attractive female assistant named Linda. As Paula's nightmares persist, Linda provides her with comfort and support, even allowing Paula to sleep in her bed. When Paula finds Linda editing her novel one morning, she flies into a rage. Linda reacts by murdering Paula's cat. Unaware of the cat's disappearance and feeling guilt for shouting at Linda, Paula apologises to Linda and admits that she is impressed by Linda's additions to the book. Linda offers to write some more of it and allows Paula to take the day off. Linda then takes control of the book and Paula's life, screaming at her to send the staff home when the noise they make distracts her. Too timid to fight back, Paula meekly obeys Linda and becomes bedridden, with Linda locking her in her room. When a successful writer named Robert Gainor comes to the house to interview Paula, Linda answers the door, claiming to be Paula, and invites Gainor into the kitchen, where they open a bottle of wine and eat some cheese with biscuits. When Gainor asks Linda if he can record their interview, she flirts with him before slashing his throat and revealing that her brother abused her when she was thirteen, and she stabbed him to death. She hides Gainor's body in the cellar and tells Paula that he simply came to interview her, but Linda told him that she was busy, and he left. When the housekeeper, Mrs. Brown, finds Gainor's body, Linda kills her.

One night, Paula awakes from a nightmare discovering that she has cut her wrist and the sheets are covered with blood. Soothing her and bandaging her wounds, Linda changes the bedclothes and sends Paula back to bed.

Meanwhile, Paula's psychiatrist Leo Fox and her publicist Sara Phillips discuss Paula over dinner. They are beginning to worry about her seclusion, having not seen her since she went to Crow's Hall. When they get back to Leo's home, he plays a recording of a furious Linda screaming and swearing. When a disturbed Sara asks who it is, Leo says it is the voice of someone stalking Paula since she was a girl.

When the young gardener, Josh, comes the following day asking after Mrs. Brown, Linda, concealing a kitchen knife behind her back, tells him that she is down in the cellar. Paula has escaped from her room and witnesses the ensuing scene. Josh tells Linda to ask Mrs. Brown to contact him before leaving the house. Linda shuts the door behind him, allowing Paula to see the knife behind her back. Linda turns and sees Paula on the stairs, and the terrified Paula flees back to her room, locking Linda out.

Later on, she goes down to the cellar and finds the bodies of Gainor and Mrs. Brown. When she emerges, Linda is waiting with a knife but when Paula flees back to her room, she does not attempt to pursue her. In a panic, Paula phones Leo, leaving a message on his phone telling him that she is locked in the house with Linda who has killed two people. After receiving the message, Leo drives over to Crow's Hall accompanied by Sara. He reveals that Linda does not exist but is a split personality developed by Paula to cope with her brother's abuse as a teenager. This recurrent alternate personality has been "stalking" Paula ever since. When they arrive at Crow's Hall, Leo finds Paula sitting on the floor sobbing. Sara finds Paula/Linda's laptop and the book's manuscript, which she discovers is extremely good.

Meanwhile, Paula slips back into Linda's personality and stabs Leo to death. Sara attempts to leave the house with the laptop but comes across Linda. Regaining control, Paula warns Sara to flee. Sara runs back to her car, discovering that she has left her keys in the house. As Linda regains control, she pursues Sara, who runs barefoot into the forest, only to be grabbed by Linda/Paula, whom she rams into a tree. Paula is impaled on a jagged piece of wood extending from the tree and dies. Sara takes the laptop and claims authorship of the manuscript. The film ends with the book being published with Sara's voice stating, "Everything's just perfect", presumably becoming wealthy and famous.

Cast

Reception
Jennie Kermode of Eye For Film gave it a positive review, saying "What makes this film work so well is the effectiveness with which it preserves the ambiguity of the situation for most of its running time."  Todd Martin of HORRORNEWS.net also received it positively, saying that "the big twist is nothing short of awesome."  He tempered that by describing the first thirty minutes of the film as "very boring and slow-moving".

The film received negative reviews also, with Adam Cook writing "Not only does the film fail to mix things up but it also fails to wring any tension from the scenario or adequately play with the fractured mental state of the characters."  DiscDish also reviewed it negatively, writing "The plot is ridiculous, the scenes predictable, the “horror” factor laughable. But then, what else would you expect?"

References

External links

2010 films
2010 horror films
2010 psychological thriller films
British horror films
Remakes of British films
Films about dissociative identity disorder
Films about stalking
Films about writers
Films set in country houses
Horror film remakes
2010s psychological horror films
British serial killer films
British slasher films
2010s English-language films
2010s British films